The terpinenes are a group of isomeric hydrocarbons that are classified as monoterpenes.  They each have the same molecular formula and carbon framework, but they differ in the position of carbon-carbon double bonds.  α-Terpinene has been isolated from cardamom and marjoram oils, and from other natural sources.  β-Terpinene has no known natural source but has been prepared from sabinene.  γ-Terpinene and δ-terpinene (also known as terpinolene) have been isolated from a variety of plant sources.  They are all colorless liquids with a turpentine-like odor.

Production and uses
α-Terpinene is produced industrially by acid-catalyzed rearrangement of α-pinene.  It has perfume and flavoring properties but is mainly used to confer pleasant odor to industrial fluids.  Hydrogenation gives the saturated derivative p-menthane.

Biosynthesis of α-terpinene

The biosynthesis of α-terpinene and other terpenoids starts with the isomerization of geranyl pyrophosphate to linalyl pyrophosphate (LPP). LPP then forms a resonance-stabilized cation by loss of the pyrophosphate group. Cyclization is then completed thanks to this more favorable stereochemistry of the LPP cation, yielding a terpinyl cation. Finally, a 1,2-hydride shift via a Wagner-Meerwein rearrangement produces the terpinen-4-yl cation. It is the loss of a hydrogen from this cation that generates α-terpinene.

Plants that produce terpinene 
 Cuminum cyminum
 Melaleuca alternifolia
 Cannabis 
 Origanum syriacum
Coriandrum sativum

References 

Monoterpenes
Dienes
Cyclohexenes
Cyclohexadienes